The state of Kentucky is served by the following area codes:

 270/364, which serve western Kentucky and the western half of South Central Kentucky.
 502, which serves the Louisville and Frankfort areas.
 606, which serves eastern Kentucky, including the Eastern Coalfield.
 859, which serves the Lexington area and Northern Kentucky.

Area code list
 
Kentucky
Area codes